José María "Mami" Quevedo García (born 1 June 1969) is a Spanish retired footballer who played mostly as a central midfielder.

Club career
Born in Cádiz, Quevedo's professional career began with local Cádiz CF, making his La Liga debut in 1989–90 (11 matches during the season). Alongside another club youth graduate, Kiko, he would be instrumental in the Andalusians successive successful struggles with relegation three years in a row.

After Cádiz's relegation in 1993, Quevedo moved with Kiko to Atlético Madrid, but failed to settle unlike the centre-forward, signing for Real Valladolid after just one season. In his second year he scored a career-best 13 goals, helping the team to barely avoid top-flight relegation, and added ten the following campaign.

Quevedo then joined Cádiz neighbours Sevilla FC – one promotion and one relegation – and Rayo Vallecano, helping the Madrid side to remain three consecutive years in the top tier. He retired in June 2004 at the age of 35 with his first club, in division two.

Personal life
Quevedo shared birthplace and date with Arteaga, also a Cádiz youth graduate. On 26 December 1999, he married television presenter Cristina Tàrrega.

References

External links

Stats and bio at Cadistas1910 

1969 births
Living people
Spanish footballers
Footballers from Cádiz
Association football midfielders
La Liga players
Segunda División players
Cádiz CF players
Atlético Madrid footballers
Real Valladolid players
Sevilla FC players
Rayo Vallecano players
Beijing Guoan F.C. non-playing staff
Shanghai Shenhua F.C. non-playing staff
Spanish expatriate sportspeople in China